The Roman Catholic Diocese of Singida is a diocese located in Singida in the Ecclesiastical province of Dodoma in Tanzania.

History
 1972.03.25: Established as Diocese of Singida from the Diocese of Dodoma, Metropolitan Archdiocese of Tabora and Diocese of Mbeya

Leadership
 Bishops of Singida (Roman rite)
 Bishop Bernard Mabula (March 25, 1972 – April 19, 1999)
 Bishop Desiderius Rwoma (April 19, 1999 - January 15, 2013), appointed Bishop of Bukoba
 Bishop Edward Mapunda (April 28, 2015 – present)

See also
Roman Catholicism in Tanzania

Sources
 GCatholic.org
 Catholic Hierarchy

Singida
Christian organizations established in 1972
Roman Catholic dioceses and prelatures established in the 20th century
Singida, Roman Catholic Diocese of
1970s establishments in Tanzania